The Outstanding Structure Award is an award presented by the International Association for Bridge and Structural Engineering to the Engineer, Architect, Contractor, and the Owner in recognition of the most remarkable, innovative, creative or otherwise stimulating structure completed within the last few years.

The Award consists of a Plaque that can be fixed to the winning structure. One or more structures are awarded annually since 2000.

Recipients

External links
Outstanding Structure Award

Architecture awards
International awards
Structural engineering
Awards established in 2000